The following elections occurred in the year 1845.

North America

United States
 1845 Texas gubernatorial election
 United States Senate elections in New York, 1845

Texas
 1845 Texas gubernatorial election

See also
 :Category:1845 elections

1845
Elections